Thomas Hall may refer to:

Politicians
Thomas Hall (North Dakota politician) (1869–1958), American U.S. congressman for North Dakota
Thomas Hall (MP for Lincolnshire) (1619–1667), MP for Lincolnshire 1654–1656
Thomas Hall (MP for Ipswich), MP for Ipswich in 1510
Thomas Hall (by 1488 – 1550), MP for Huntingdon in 1529
Thomas H. Hall (1773–1853), American U.S. congressman for North Carolina
Thomas F. Hall (born 1939), George W. Bush appointed Assistant Secretary of Defense for Reserve Affairs (2002–2009)
Thomas Murray Hall (1859–1927), accountant and member of the Queensland Legislative Council

Religion
Thomas Hall (minister, born 1610) (1610–1665), English Presbyterian clergyman and author
Thomas Hall (minister at Leghorn) (1750–1825), Chaplain to the British Factory at Leghorn
Thomas Cuming Hall (1858–1936), American theologian

Others
Thomas Hall (canoeist) (born 1982), Canadian canoeist
Thomas Hall (cricketer, born 1969), English cricketer
Thomas L. Hall (1893–1918), American U.S. Army soldier and posthumous Medal of Honor recipient for actions in World War I
Thomas Sergeant Hall (1858–1915), Australian geologist
Thomas Hall (Swedish professor), professor of art history at Stockholm University
Thomas Hall (railway engineer) (1823–1889), railway engineer of the Namaqualand Railway
Thomas Seavey Hall (1827–1880), American inventor and founder of Hall Signal Company
Thomas Hall (murderer) (1848–?), New Zealand commission agent, forger and murderer
Thomas Victor Hall (1879–1965), American illustrator, painter and sculptor
Thomasine Hall also Thomas Hall, sexually ambiguous person in colonial Virginia
Thomas William Hall (1861–1937), British solicitor and philatelist
Thomas Young Hall (1802–1870), mining engineer and coal mine owner
Thomas Ramsay Hall (1879–1950), architect practicing in Brisbane, Australia
Thomas Skarratt Hall (1836–1903), bank manager and mine director in Queensland, Australia
Thomas Hall (inventor), American electricity experimenter, inventor and manufacturer

Buildings 
Thomas Hall (Gainesville, Florida), 1905 building on the University of Florida campus
Thomas Hall, Exeter, one of the University of Exeter Halls of Residence, England

See also 
Tom Hall (disambiguation)
Tommy Hall (disambiguation)

Architectural disambiguation pages